The 1953 Princeton Tigers football team was an American football team that represented Princeton University during the 1953 college football season. In their ninth year under head coach Charlie Caldwell, the Tigers compiled a 5–4 record but were outscored 204 to 144. Homer A. Smith was the team captain.

The Tigers were ranked No. 19 in the preseason AP poll but dropped out of the rankings after the first week of play.

Princeton played its home games at Palmer Stadium on the university campus in Princeton, New Jersey.

Schedule

References

Princeton
Princeton Tigers football seasons
Princeton Tigers football